Lepsøy Chapel is a chapel of the Church of Norway in Ålesund Municipality in Møre og Romsdal county, Norway. It is located on the southern part of the island of Lepsøya. It is an annex chapel for the Haram og Fjørtoft parish which is part of the Nordre Sunnmøre prosti (deanery) in the Diocese of Møre. The white, wooden church was built in a long church design in 1896 using plans drawn up by the architect . The church seats about 150 people.

History
The island of Lepsøya was given permission to build a small prayer house in 1896. In 1956, the building was renovated and enlarged as part of an upgrade to the status of annex chapel for the parish. It was consecrated in 1956.

See also
List of churches in Møre

References

Buildings and structures in Ålesund
Churches in Møre og Romsdal
Long churches in Norway
Wooden churches in Norway
19th-century Church of Norway church buildings
Churches completed in 1896
1896 establishments in Norway